Gidhni railway station is a railway station where no train stops. railway station on Howrah–Nagpur–Mumbai line under Kharagpur railway division of South Eastern Railway zone. It is situated at Gidhni in Jhargram district in the Indian state of West Bengal.

It is the bordering station of West Bengal on the Kharagpur–Tatanagar line of South Eastern Railway.

References

Railway stations in Jhargram district
Kharagpur railway division